The 1986 Oklahoma gubernatorial election was held on November 4, 1986 to elect the governor of Oklahoma. Republican former Governor and Senator Henry Bellmon won the election by a plurality with Independent Jerry Brown receiving more than twice the number of votes separating Bellmon from Democrat David Walters.

Democratic primary

Results

Republican Primary

Results

General Election

Results

References

1986
Gubernatorial
Okla